Reichardia intermedia is a species of plant in the family Asteraceae.

Sources

References 

Cichorieae
Flora of Malta